Sivinskoye is a rural locality (a village) in Polozovoskoye Rural Settlement, Bolshesosnovsky District, Perm Krai, Russia. The population was 91 as of 2010. There are 2 streets.

Geography 
Sivinskoye is located 28 km south of Bolshaya Sosnova (the district's administrative centre) by road. Ploska is the nearest rural locality.

References 

Rural localities in Bolshesosnovsky District